In May 2018 it was confirmed that season 3 of Dana White's Contender Series would commence in June 2019 and in the US would be exclusive to ESPN+, ESPN's new over-the-top subscription package. In April 2019, the schedule was elaborated, the series beginning on June 18, 2019 and ending on August 20, 2019. The promotion's name also got shortened from Dana White's Tuesday Night Contender Series to Dana White's Contender Series.

Week 1 - June 18

Contract awards 
The following fighters were awarded contracts with the UFC:
Punahele Soriano and Yorgan De Castro

Week 2 - June 25

Contract awards 
The following fighters were awarded contracts with the UFC:
Miles Johns and Miguel Baeza

Week 3 - July 9

Contract awards 
The following fighters were awarded contracts with the UFC:
Joe Solecki, Antonio Trocoli  Hunter Azure, Maki Pitolo, and Jonathan Pearce

Week 4 - July 16

Contract awards 
The following fighters were awarded contracts with the UFC:
Antônio Arroyo, Ode' Osbourne, Don'Tale Mayes, and Brendan Allen

Week 5 - July 23

Contract awards 
The following fighters were awarded contracts with the UFC:
Sean Woodson, Jamahal Hill, and Billy Quarantillo

Week 6 - July 30

Contract awards 
The following fighters were awarded contracts with the UFC:
Aleksa Camur, Aalon Cruz, Tracy Cortez, and Rodrigo Nascimento

Week 7 - August 6

Contract awards 
The following fighters were awarded contracts with the UFC:
Omar Morales, Herbert Burns, and André Muniz

Week 8 - August 13

Contract awards 
The following fighters were awarded contracts with the UFC:
Brok Weaver, Sarah Alpar, and Tony Gravely
William Knight was signed to a development league contract

Week 9 - August 20

Contract awards 
The following fighters were awarded contracts with the UFC:
Philip Rowe

Week 10 - August 27

Contract awards 
The following fighters were awarded contracts with the UFC:
Duško Todorović, Peter Barrett, and T.J. Brown

References

Ultimate Fighting Championship television series